Paul John Stojanovich (February 13, 1956 – March 15, 2003) was an American television producer who created reality television police shows. His notable creations include Cops (1989–2009), American Detective (1991–1993) and World's Wildest Police Videos (1998–2001).

Career
His father, Chester Stojanovich, was an entomologist with a Doctorate from Stanford and his mother, Martha Stojanovich, was one of the first women to work at the Centers for Disease Control. Martha was diagnosed with schizophrenia shortly after he was born. As a teenager, Stojanovich became an avid photographer, saving his money to buy an expensive Hasselblad camera and getting his own darkroom in his father's barn in Campbell, California. He won the respect of Graham Nash, an avid photographer, at the age of 13 and began to collaborate with him. At 16, he dropped out of high school and started taking film-making classes from Larry Booth in Half Moon Bay, California. His experience as a photographer made the transition to motion pictures relatively easy. .

His interest in policing began when he was attending high school in San Jose, often listening to his police scanner. He even subscribed to a CHP magazine. In 1973, at 17, Paul met San Jose Police Officer Nate Jaeger who allowed him to ride along with him on Patrol weekly. Paul turned from still photography to Super 8 camera filming of Nate's police assignments and calls. In 1973 Paul produced his first 16mm short film called "Two Bits" in black and white starring Nate Jaeger. Nate retired from the police department, after signing a film and recording contract, and moved to Beverly Hills, California. Nate initiated the first free  Rock n' Roll music site on the Internet and completed his  book "...and the rest was Rock n' Roll..."  Paul combined his interest in photography and film-making and his interest in police work when Nate convinced some friends with the Santa Clara County Sheriff's Office Narcotics unit to let him film their work. The film became the Emmy-award winning documentary Narco.

Stojanovich then spent a few years working as a cameraman for  then NBC affiliate KRON. While working at KRON, he met one of his heroes, photographer Ansel Adams, who was particularly interested in the workings of his video camera. He also worked as a field producer for the ABC news magazine 20/20 and was creative consultant on Oliver Stone's film Natural Born Killers.

After serving as a field producer for the reality show COPS in 1989 and then producing and creating the ABC series American Detective, Stojanovich executive produced a series of crime reality shows, including World's Scariest Police Chases and Ultimate Police Challenge. His legacy as an innovative creator and producer still commands respect in the entertainment business.

The Beaverton, Oregon Police Department made Stojanovich an Honorary Special Reserve Officer.

Death
Stojanovich died on March 15, 2003, after accidentally falling off a cliff on the Oregon coast while posing for a photograph his fiancée, Kim Crowell, was taking. He slipped on a wet tree root and fell  to the rocks and ocean below.

Filmography

See also 
 John Bunnell
 C. W. Jensen

References

External links 
 

1956 births
2003 deaths
Accidental deaths in Oregon
Accidental deaths from falls
American people of Serbian descent